Ottavio Piccinardi or Ottavio Picenardi (1661–1722) was a Roman Catholic prelate who served as Bishop of Reggio Emilia (1701–1722).

Biography
Piccinardi was born in Cremona, Italy on 16 August 1661.
On 14 March 1701, he was appointed during the papacy of Pope Clement XI as Bishop of Reggio Emilia.
On 3 April 1701, he was consecrated bishop. 
He served as Bishop of Reggio Emilia until his death in December 1722.

References

External links and additional sources
 (for Chronology of Bishops) 
 (for Chronology of Bishops) 

18th-century Italian Roman Catholic bishops
Bishops appointed by Pope Clement XI
1661 births
1722 deaths